Phthonerodes peridela is a moth in the family Xyloryctidae. It was described by Ian Francis Bell Common in 1964. It is found in Australia, where it has been recorded from the Australian Capital Territory, New South Wales and Queensland.

References

Phthonerodes
Moths described in 1964